Vajira (also called Vajirakumari) was Empress of the Magadha Empire as the principal consort of Emperor Ajatashatru. She was the mother of her husband's successor, Emperor Udayibhadra.

Vajira was born a princess of the Kingdom of Kosala and was the daughter of King Pasenadi and Queen Mallika. She was also the niece of her mother-in-law, Empress Kosala Devi,  the first wife and chief consort of Emperor Bimbisara and the sister of King Pasenadi.

Life

Birth

Vajira or Vajirakumari was born to Pasenadi's chief queen, Mallika. According to Pali tradition, her mother was a beautiful daughter of the chief garland maker of Kosala. When the princess was born, her father was apparently disappointed on hearing the child was a girl, but Buddha assured him that some women were wiser than men.

Marriage

The events which led to her betrothal and eventual marriage to Ajatashatru was that her husband waged a war against her father's kingdom after Bimbisara's death, the cause of the conflict being the revenues from the estate of Kashi, which was given as a dowry to Kosala Devi in her marriage to Bimbisara. After Kosala Devi's death, Pasenadi immediately confiscated the revenues of the estate of Kashi, which had been settled on her as "pin-money", this resulted in hostilities between him and Ajatashatru.

The duel between Ajatashatru and her father was a prolonged affair, fortune favouring each combatant alternatively. Though, Pasenadi emerged victorious, and came to terms with his nephew. He gave the seventeen-year-old Vajira's hand in marriage to him. The estate of Kashi, which had been the reason of the conflict, was given to his daughter, Vajira, as a part of her dowry in her marriage to Ajatashatru. Pasenadi also assigned the revenues from the estate of Kashi to Vajira.

References

Citations

Sources
 

Haryanka dynasty
Indian empresses
People from Kosala
6th-century BC women
5th-century BC women
Indian Buddhists
Ancient Indian women
Ancient princesses
6th-century BC Indian people
5th-century BC Indian people